Ignace Baguibassa Sambar-Talkena (March 31, 1935 – February 3, 2013) was the second bishop of the Roman Catholic Diocese of Kara, Togo.

Ordained to the priesthood on 30 June 1963, Sambar-Talkena was ordained bishop on 6 January 1996, following the death of his predecessor Ernest Patili Assi. He resigned on 7 January 2009 and was succeeded by Jacques Danka Longa. He held the title of bishop emeritus until his death in Lomé in 2013.

He was born in the village of Baga, a village neighboring Niamtougou. He spoke Nawdm and French.

For many years he was President of the Episcopal Commission for Catholic Education in the Bishops' Conference of Togo.

Notes

1935 births
2013 deaths
Togolese Roman Catholic bishops
Roman Catholic bishops of Kara
21st-century Togolese people